Hitz is an American comedy television series.

Hitz may also refer to:

 Hitz (1992 film), a 1992 film by William Sachs, also known as Judgement
 "Hitz" (song), a 2011 song by Chase & Status
 Hitz (radio station), a Malaysian pop radio station
 Hitz (surname)
 Hitz Radio, defunct UK internet radio station

See also
 
 Hits (disambiguation)
 NHL Hitz (disambiguation), a series of ice hockey video games